This is a list of notable and representative Polish composers.

Note: This list should contain notable composers, best with an existing article on Wikipedia. If a notable Polish composer is missing and without an article, please add the name here.

Middle Ages 

 Wincenty z Kielczy (before 1200-c. 1261)
 Mikołaj z Radomia (15th century)
 Piotr z Grudziądza (c. 1400-c. 1480)

Renaissance 

 Sebastian z Felsztyna (c. 1480/1490-after 1543)
 Nicolaus Cracoviensis (1st half of the 16th century)
 Wacław z Szamotuł (c. 1526-1560)
 Mikołaj Gomółka (1535-1591)
 Marcin Leopolita (c. 1540-c.1589)
 Cyprian Bazylik (c.1535-c. 1600)
 Jan z Lublina (late 15th century-1540)
 Jakub Polak (1540-1605)
 Sebastian Klonowic (c. 1545-1602)
 Krzysztof Klabon (c. 1550-after 1616)
 Wojciech Długoraj (1557-1619)
 Diomedes Cato (c. 1570-c. 1603)

Baroque 
Mikołaj Zieleński (1st half of the 17th century)
Adam Jarzębski (c. 1590-1649)
Franciszek Lilius (c. 1600-1657)
Marcin Mielczewski (1600-1651)
Bartłomiej Pękiel (1633-ca.1670)
Jacek Różycki (1625/35-1703/04)
Stanisław Sylwester Szarzyński (prob. 2nd half of the 17th century)
Andrzej Siewiński (died by 1726)
Grzegorz Gerwazy Gorczycki (1665/67-1734)

18th and 19th centuries 
Michał Kazimierz Ogiński (1728-1800)
Bazyli Bohdanowicz (1740-1817)
Maciej Radziwiłł (1749-1800)
Wojciech Żywny (1756-1842)
Michał Kleofas Ogiński (1765-1833)
Ludwig-Wilhelm Tepper de Ferguson (1768-1838)
Józef Ksawery Elsner (1769-1854)
Franciszek Lessel (1780-1838)
Franciszek Ścigalski (1782-1846)
Karol Kurpiński (1785-1857)
Maria Szymanowska (1789-1831)
Karol Lipiński (1790-1861)
Franciszek Mirecki (1791–1862)
Feliks Horecki (1796–1870)
Eduard Sobolewski (1804-1872)
Jan Nepomucen Bobrowicz (1805-1881)
Ignacy Feliks Dobrzyński (1807-1867)
Mateusz Rudkowski (1809-1887)
Julian Fontana (1810-1869)
Fryderyk Chopin (1810-1849)
Józef Władysław Krogulski (1815-1842)
Stanisław Moniuszko (1819-1872)
Michał Bergson (1820-1898)
Ignacy Krzyżanowski (1826-1905)
Tekla Bądarzewska-Baranowska (1829-1861)
Theodor Leschetizky (1830-1915)
Henryk Wieniawski (1835-1880)
Józef Wieniawski (1837-1912)
Władysław Żeleński (1837-1921)
Zygmunt Noskowski (1846-1909)
Maurycy Moszkowski (1854-1925)
Juliusz Zarębski (1854-1885)

20th century and contemporary 
Aleksander Michałowski (1851-1938)
Moritz Moszkowski (1854-1925)
Natalia Janotha (1856-1932)
Timothee Adamowski (1858-1943)
Konstanty Gorski (1859-1924)
Roman Statkowski (1859-1925)
Ignacy Jan Paderewski (1864-1941)
Otton Mieczysław Żukowski (1867-1942)
Leopold Godowsky (1870-1938)
Emil Młynarski (1870-1935)
Zygmunt Denis Antoni Jordan de Stojowski (1870-1946)
Witold Maliszewski (1873-1939)
Mieczysław Karłowicz (1876-1909)
Feliks Nowowiejski (1877-1946)
Grzegorz Fitelberg (1879-1953)
Karol Szymanowski (1882-1937)
Ludomir Różycki (1883-1953)
Apolinary Szeluto (1884-1966)
Anna Maria Klechniowska (1888-1973)
Jerzy Petersburski (1895-1979)
Józef Koffler (1896-1944)
Bolesław Szabelski (1896-1979)
Tadeusz Szeligowski (1896-1963)
Zygmunt Białostocki (1897-1942)
Alexandre Tansman (1897-1986)
Bolesław Woytowicz (1899-1980)
Alexander Lipsky (1900-1985)
Kazimierz Wiłkomirski (1900-1995)
Bronisław Kaper (1902-1983)
Henryk Wars (1902-1977)
Roman Palester (1907-1989)
Zbigniew Turski (1908-1979)
Grażyna Bacewicz (1909-1969)
Roman Maciejewski (1910-1998)
Stefan Kisielewski (1911-1991)
Władysław Szpilman (1911-2000)
Irena Pfeiffer (1912-1996)
Witold Lutosławski (1913-1994)
Witold Rudziński (1913-2004)
Daniel Sternberg (1913-2000)
Jerzy Wasowski (1913-1984)
Andrzej Panufnik (1914-1991)
Edward Olearczyk (1915-1994) 
Mieczysław Weinberg (1919-1996)
Janina Skowronska (1920-1992)
Witold Silewicz (1921-2007)
Kazimierz Serocki (1922-1981)
Henryk Czyż (1923-2003)
Krystyna Moszumańska-Nazar (1924-2009)
Włodzimierz Kotoński (1925-2014)
Witold Szalonek (1927-2001)
Tadeusz Baird (1928-1981)
Bogusław Schaeffer (born 1929)
Józef Świder (1930-2014)
Krzysztof Komeda (1931-1969)
Andrzej Kurylewicz (1932-2007)
Wojciech Kilar (1932-2013)
Henryk Górecki (1933-2010)
Krzysztof Penderecki (1933-2020)
Aleksander Szeligowski (1934-1993)
André Tchaikowsky (1935-1982)
Marek Stachowski (1936-2004)
Marian Sawa (1937-2005)
Zygmunt Konieczny (born 1937)
Zygmunt Krauze (born 1938)
Tomasz Sikorski (1939-1988) 
Andrzej Korzyński (born 1940)
Krzysztof Meyer (born 1943)
Joanna Bruzdowicz (born 1943)
Marta Ptaszyńska (born 1943)
Elżbieta Sikora (born 1943)
Paweł Łukaszewski (born 1945)
Grażyna Pstrokońska-Nawratil (born 1947)
Grażyna Krzanowska (born 1952)
Jan A. P. Kaczmarek (born 1953)
Krzesimir Dębski (born 1953)
Paweł Szymański (born 1954)
Zbigniew Preisner (born 1955)
Zbigniew Karkowski (1958-2013)
Piotr Moss (born 1949)
Michał Lorenc (born 1955)
Jan Pogány (born 1960)
Hanna Kulenty (born 1961)
Bettina Skrzypczak (born 1962)
Paweł Łukaszewski (born 1968)
Piotr Rubik (born 1968)
Paweł Mykietyn (born 1971)
Maciej Zieliński (born 1971)
Marcel Chyrzyński (born 1971)
Abel Korzeniowski (born 1972)
Adam Sztaba (born 1975)
Kasia Glowicka (born 1977)
Marcin Stańczyk (born 1977)
Agata Zubel (born 1978)
Klaudia Pasternak (born 1980)
Jagoda Szmytka (born 1982)

See also 

 List of Poles
 Music of Poland

External links 
 Professor Adrian Thomas: Before Chopin (lecture)
 The Briefest History of Polish Music by Maria Anna Harley (Maja Trochimczyk)
Schools of Polish Composers: A Quick Guide 
 What Makes a Composer Polish?

Polish
 
Composers
Polish music-related lists